Willunga South is a town south of Adelaide, South Australia in the City of Onkaparinga local government area. Willunga South is established in the Sellicks Hill Range and is located at the base of Delabole Hill. It is approximately 48 km from the Adelaide CBD.

References

Towns in South Australia